The Ring deutscher Pfadfinderverbände (RdP; German Scout Federation) is the German national Scouting organization within the World Organization of the Scout Movement (WOSM). It serves 115,944 members (as of 2011).

The RdP was founded as Ring deutscher Pfadfinderbünde in 1949 by three Scouting associations:
 Bund Deutscher Pfadfinder (BDP, interreligious)
 Christliche Pfadfinderschaft Deutschlands (CPD, Protestant)
 Deutsche Pfadfinderschaft Sankt Georg (DPSG, Roman Catholic).
It became a member of WOSM in 1950.

In 1973, following the disintegration of the BDP and the merger of the CPD with its Guiding counterparts, it was renamed the Ring deutscher Pfadfinderverbände. The current members are:
 Bund der Pfadfinderinnen und Pfadfinder (BdP, interreligious, co-ed)
 Deutsche Pfadfinderschaft Sankt Georg (DPSG, Roman Catholic, co-ed)
 Verband Christlicher Pfadfinderinnen und Pfadfinder (VCP, Protestant, co-ed).
 Bund Moslemischer Pfadfinder und Pfadfinderinnen Deutschlands (BMPPD, Muslim, co-ed)
Three of these, the BdP, the VCP, and the BMPPD, are also members of the World Association of Girl Guides and Girl Scouts, via the Ring Deutscher Pfadfinderinnenverbände. Both federations work strongly together in the main fields of Scouting and Guiding.

See also 
 Scouting in Germany

References

External links 
 

Scouting and Guiding in Germany
World Organization of the Scout Movement member organizations
Youth organizations established in 1949
1949 establishments in Germany